"Diamonds" is a song by American trumpeter Herb Alpert from his 27th studio album, Keep Your Eye on Me (1987). Released as the second single from Keep Your Eye on Me on March 14, 1987, by A&M Records, the song features lead and background vocals by American singers Janet Jackson and Lisa Keith.

Song information
This single marked a comeback for Herb Alpert. Four tracks on the song's album, Keep Your Eye on Me, were produced by Jimmy Jam and Terry Lewis, who melded Alpert's sound with their own Minneapolis funk.

Music video
In the music video, Herb Alpert appears in "Bucky's" nightclub, where the DJ plays his new single. The song is a hit with the crowd, and Alpert and his band perform on stage. Meanwhile, Janet Jackson heads back to the club in a limo, though Jackson herself does not appear in the video; a look-alike is used for the limo scenes and the silhouette of Jackson in the club. A child breaks through the look-alike's silhouette and performs as Jackson.

Live performance
Janet Jackson included the song on her 2011 tour Number Ones: Up Close and Personal and as a DJ interlude on the 2015-2016 
Unbreakable World Tour.

Chart performance
"Diamonds" was a hit in the U.S., peaking at #5 on the Billboard Hot 100, and at #1 on the Hot R&B/Hip-Hop Singles & Tracks. The single also went to #1 on the Hot Dance Music/Club Play and Hot Dance Music/Maxi-Singles Sales charts in the U.S. "Diamonds" was a hit in countries such as Canada and the Netherlands, but a more modest chart success in the UK and Australia. Its successor, "Making Love in the Rain", would reach #35 on the Hot 100 in September 1987.

Weekly charts

Year-end charts

Track listing
Japan 5" CD single
 "Diamonds" (Cool Summer Mix) – 6:19
 "Diamonds" (Cool Summer Dance Mix) – 5:55
 "Diamonds" (Cool Summer Instrumental) – 5:27
 "Diamonds" (Cool Summer Dub Version) – 4:23
 "Diamonds" (Cool Summer 7" Edit) – 3:54
 "Diamonds" (dance mix) – 6:48
 "Diamonds" (instrumental) – 5:14
 "Diamonds" (Beats Dubcapella) – 3:12

UK 7" vinyl single
 "Diamonds" (edit) – 3:58
 "Rocket to the Moon" – 3:52

UK Cassette single
 "Diamonds" (dance mix)
 "Diamonds" (edit)
 "Diamonds" (instrumental)
 "Rocket to the Moon"

US 7" vinyl single
 "Diamonds" – 4:53
 "African Flame" – 3:58

US 12" maxi single mix vinyl SP-12231
 "Diamonds" (dance mix) – 6:45
 "Diamonds" (instrumental) – 5:10
 "Diamonds" (Beats Dubcapella) – 3:10

US 12" maxi single mix vinyl promotional copy - non for sale SP-17475
 "Diamonds" (Cool Summer Mix) – 6:16
 "Diamonds" (Cool Summer Dance Mix) – 5:51
 "Diamonds" (instrumental) - 5:23
 "Diamonds" (Dub Version) – 4:20
 "Diamonds" (7" Edit) – 3:50

Japan 7" vinyl single
 "Diamonds" – 4:53
 "Stranger on the Shore" – 2:54

References

1987 singles
Herb Alpert songs
Janet Jackson songs
Songs written by Jimmy Jam and Terry Lewis
Song recordings produced by Jimmy Jam and Terry Lewis
1987 songs
1986 songs
A&M Records singles